Ahmad Nafisi (1919–2004) was an Iranian bureaucrat who briefly served as the mayor of Tehran between 1962 and 1963 and as director of the plan organization. His career abruptly ended in 1963 when he was jailed. He was released from the prison in 1967 after he was cleared of all charges.

Biography
Nafisi was born in 1919. He graduated from the University of Tehran and then from American University in Washington, D.C.. 

On 22 May 1962 Nafisi was appointed by  Prime Minister Ali Amini as the mayor of Tehran. During his term French President Charles de Gaulle visited Tehran and awarded Nafisi with the Legion of Honour medal. The French magazine Paris Match featured President de Gaulle and Nafisi following the visit. Nafisi organized and hosted the opening meeting of the newly established association, Congress of Free Man and Women, on 27 August 1963.

Nafisi was arrested in November 1963 and jailed for his alleged involvement in activities against the rule of the Shah Mohammad Reza Pahlavi and for corruption claims. It was also claimed that Nafisi had relations with the rebellious clergy. He was found not to be guilty of doing something wrong and was released from prison in 1967. Michael Axworthy argued that his imprisonment was a result of the Prime Minister Hassan Ali Mansur's jealousy of Nafisi.

Nafisi married Nezhat Nafisi, and they had a daughter, Azar. He died in 2004.

References
 

1919 births
2004 deaths
Mayors of Tehran
Iranian prisoners and detainees
Recipients of the Legion of Honour
University of Tehran alumni
American University alumni